Farrago is a Latin word, meaning "mixed cattle fodder", used to refer to a confused variety of miscellaneous things. As a name, it may refer to:
Farrago (plant), a genus of plants in the family Poaceae
Farrago (magazine), student newspaper at the University of Melbourne
Farrago rerum theologicarum, a book by Wessel Gansfort
Ronnie Scott's Jazz Farrago